Rusca may refer to:

Places

Romania
 Rusca, a village in Teregova Commune, Caraş-Severin County
 Rusca, a village in Dorna-Arini Commune, Suceava County
 Rusca, a village in Pădureni Commune, Vaslui County
Rusca Montană, a commune in Caraş-Severin County
 Rusca (Bistrița, left bank), a left bank tributary of the river Bistrița in Suceava County
 Rusca (Bistrița, right bank), a right bank tributary of the river Bistrița in Suceava County
 Rusca, a tributary of the Sucevița in Suceava County
 Rusca (Bistra), a right tributary of the river Bistra in Caraș-Severin County

Moldova
 Rusca, a village in Lăpușna Commune, Raionul Hîncești

Ukraine
 Rusca, the Romanian name for Ruska village, Seliatyn, Chernivtsi Oblast, Ukraine

People 
 Claudia Rusca (1593–1676), Italian nun and musician
 Francesco Carlo Rusca (1693–1769), Swiss-Italian portrait painter
 Jean-Baptiste Dominique Rusca (1759–1814), French general of the Napoleonic period
 Nicolò Rusca (1563–1618), Italian priest beatified in 2013

See also 
Rus (surname)
Rusu (disambiguation)
Ruseni (disambiguation)
Rusești (disambiguation)
Rusciori (disambiguation)